Doney Park is a census-designated place in Coconino County, Arizona, United States. It is a residential area northeast of Flagstaff, located off U.S. Route 89 and is in the 86004 zip code.

The area is named for Kevin Doney, a northern Arizona pioneer. Many of the homes in this community are on lots of one acre or larger. The area is known for its views of the San Francisco Peaks and Sunset Crater Volcano.

As of the 2010 census, the population of Doney Park was 5,395.

Demographics

References 

Census-designated places in Coconino County, Arizona